Sir Harry Burrard, 1st Baronet (1707 – 12 April 1791) was a British politician who sat in the House of Commons for 37 years from 1741 to 1778.

Early life
Burrard was the eldest son of Paul Burrard MP, of Walhampton, and his wife Lucy Dutton-Colt, daughter of Sir Thomas Dutton-Colt, Envoy to the Courts of Hanover and Dresden. In 1728, Burrard was appointed Gentleman Usher to Frederick, Prince of Wales and in 1731 was appointed as a Collector of the Customs of London. In 1738, Burrard succeeded his father to Walhampton Manor.

Political career
The Burrard family had a strong interest in the port town of Lymington, which usually enabled them to fill both of its seats in Parliament. Burrard's father and grandfather both represented the borough in Parliament. At the 1761 he was returned as Member of Parliament for the Lymington constituency and retained the seat until 1778. He was appointed riding forester of the New Forest in 1754 and Governor of Calshot Castle in 1761. On 3 April 1769, he was made a baronet, of Walhampton in the County of Southampton, with a special remainder to his brothers.

Family
In 1731, Burrard married firstly Alicia Snape, daughter of Francis° Snape, and in 1754, secondly Mary Frances Clarke, daughter of James Clarke. He had a daughter and four sons by his first wife and a daughter and a son by his second wife. His sons died all before him, so he was succeeded in his baronetcy by Harry Burrard-Neale, the oldest son of his younger brother.

Notes

References

'Parishes: Boldre', A History of the County of Hampshire: Volume 4 (1911), pp. 616–623. URL: http://www.british-history.ac.uk/report.aspx?compid=56896. Retrieved 22 May 2011

1707 births
1791 deaths
Baronets in the Baronetage of Great Britain
British MPs 1741–1747
British MPs 1747–1754
British MPs 1754–1761
British MPs 1761–1768
British MPs 1768–1774
British MPs 1774–1780
Members of the Parliament of Great Britain for English constituencies